Dolichosudis fuliginosa is a species of barracudina found in the Atlantic Ocean and Western Pacific Ocean at a depths of around .  This species grows to a length of  SL.  This species is the only known member of its genus.

References
 

Post, A.1977.Paralepididae.In FAO Species Identification Sheets, Western Central Atlantic (Fishing Area 31), Volume III,
edited by W. Fischer. Rome, FAO

Paralepididae
Monotypic fish genera
Fish described in 1969